İlhan İşbilen (born 1 April 1946) is a Turkish businessman and former Justice and Development Party (AKP) politician. He resigned from AKP in February 2014, and has been jailed since December 2015, but denies all charges against him.

On 15 November 2019 his wife Nebahat transferred £750,000 to Prince Andrew, Duke of York in the belief that it would help her to secure a passport. The Duke repaid the funds.

References

1946 births
Living people
Members of the Grand National Assembly of Turkey
Justice and Development Party (Turkey) politicians
Turkish businesspeople